Alaviyya Babayeva Hanifa Kizi (12 August 1921 – 23 September 2014) was a prose author, translator of contemporary Russian literature, and publicist.

Early life and education
Babayeva graduated from Baku State University. She began writing in 1936, with a story entitled "Two Lives".

Works
I am not alone
My Teacher (Book for children)
Country Roads (Book for children)
Again Spring (Book for children)
Mulberry Tree (Story collection)
Shadow (Story collection)
People and Fates (novel)
Where Are You, Friend? (novel)
Looking for You
Maybe There Will Be No Tomorrow

References

External links

Azerbaijani novelists
Azerbaijani women novelists
Azerbaijani women short story writers
Azerbaijani women children's writers
Soviet writers
1921 births
2014 deaths
People's Artists of Azerbaijan
Soviet Azerbaijani people
20th-century Azerbaijani novelists
21st-century Azerbaijani novelists
20th-century Azerbaijani women writers
20th-century short story writers
21st-century Azerbaijani women writers
Writers from Baku